Animal Science Journal is a monthly peer-reviewed scientific journal covering research in dairy agriculture and animal science. The journal was established in 1930 and is published by John Wiley & Sons, Inc. on behalf of the Japanese Society of Animal Science. The editor-in-chief is Kazuhiro Kikuchi (Tohoku University).

Abstracting and indexing
The journal is abstracted and indexed in:

According to the Journal Citation Reports, the journal has a 2020 impact factor of 1.749.

References

External links

Wiley (publisher) academic journals
Animal science journals
Academic journals associated with learned and professional societies
Monthly journals
English-language journals
Publications established in 1930